Robert McCammon (April 14, 1941 – December 23, 2021) was a Canadian professional ice hockey centre and a National Hockey League (NHL) and American Hockey League (AHL) head coach and general manager. He was a pro scout with the Detroit Red Wings.

Hockey career
McCammon never played in the NHL, spending his entire career in the minor leagues, playing centre with the Port Huron Flags/Wings (International Hockey League) for nine years, and then beginning his coaching career with the same team (1973-74). He later became head coach of the Maine Mariners of the American Hockey League and won the Calder Cup in 1977-78 and 1978–79, the first two years of the team's existence. McCammon had two stints as head coach of the Philadelphia Flyers, also serving as the team's general manager during the latter. He was also the head coach of the Vancouver Canucks and an assistant coach for the Edmonton Oilers on two occasions. Interestingly, in the two times he was fired as coach (Philadelphia and Vancouver), he was replaced by Pat Quinn. With Vancouver in 1988–89, he was runner-up to Pat Burns of the Montreal Canadiens for the Jack Adams Trophy as NHL Coach of the Year. He won the Stanley Cup with the Edmonton Oilers in 1987 as director of player development, and in 2002 and 2008 as a scout with Detroit. McCammon's name was added to the Stanley Cup in 2002 with Detroit.

Personal life
In 2007, McCammon - along with former Canucks goaltender Kirk McLean - was a co-owner of the Gastown restaurant So.cial in Vancouver. By 2010, McLean had taken over the restaurant and rebranded it as McLean's. McCammon died on December 23, 2021, at the age of 80.

Coaching record

References

External links

1941 births
2021 deaths
Canadian ice hockey centres
Canadian ice hockey coaches
Detroit Red Wings scouts
Edmonton Oilers coaches
Edmonton Oilers executives
Edmonton Oilers scouts
Ice hockey people from Ontario
Maine Mariners
National Hockey League executives
Sportspeople from Kenora
Philadelphia Flyers coaches
Philadelphia Flyers executives
Port Huron Flags (IHL) players
Port Huron Wings players
Stanley Cup champions
Tri-City Americans coaches
Vancouver Canucks coaches